Artur Taymazov (born 20 July 1979) is an Ossetian-Uzbek-Russian wrestler and politician. He was Uzbekistan's most decorated Olympian before being stripped of two gold medals for doping. In 2016, he was elected to the 7th State Duma of the Russian Federation representing United Russia.

On 5 April 2017 it was announced that as a result of retesting samples he had been disqualified from the 2008 Olympics for a drug violation, and his gold medal withdrawn. On 23 July 2019 it was announced that as a result of retesting samples he had been disqualified from the 2012 Olympics for a drug violation, and his gold medal from that event also withdrawn.

Early life
In childhood, he was doing weightlifting but when he turned 11, a freestyle wrestling club opened in his village and he decided to wrestle. His older brother Tymur Taymazov was a 1996 Olympic Games champion in weightlifting, competing for Ukraine.

Olympics

2000 Sydney Olympics
Making his Olympic debut in Sydney in 2000, he won Uzbekistan's first Olympic wrestling medal in the 130 kg weight class, losing to Russian David Musul'bes in the final.

2004 Athens Olympics
In the 2004 Games in Athens he became Uzbekistan's first multiple-medalist after winning gold in the 120 kg weight class.

2008 Beijing Olympics
He successfully defended his 120 kg title in Beijing four years later, this time defeating Musul'bes in the semifinals, winning 3–0, 1–0 in the final against Russian Bakhtiyar Akhmedov.
After his second olympic title in Beijing, he was honored in his country by the Buyuk Hizmatlari Uchun Order ("For Outstanding Services").

His urine sample was retested in 2016, and he was found to be taking a banned substance.  He was stripped of his medal with his 2012 results as pending.

2012 London Olympics
In the 2012 Games in London he won his third consecutive Gold Medal by beating Davit Modzmanashvili of Georgia in the final by 2-0.

The athlete's page which introduced Taymazov, his height was wrongly shown as 1.75 m, but his actual height was 1.90 m.

On 23 July 2019 it was announced that as a result of retesting samples he had been disqualified from the 2012 Olympics for a drug violation, and his gold medal from that event also withdrawn.

Politics 
He is a member of the State Duma since 2016, representing the North Ossetia constituency.

References

External links
 
 

1979 births
Living people
Uzbekistani male sport wrestlers
Olympic wrestlers of Uzbekistan
Wrestlers at the 2000 Summer Olympics
Wrestlers at the 2004 Summer Olympics
Wrestlers at the 2008 Summer Olympics
Wrestlers at the 2012 Summer Olympics
Olympic gold medalists for Uzbekistan
Olympic silver medalists for Uzbekistan
Olympic medalists in wrestling
Medalists at the 2000 Summer Olympics
Medalists at the 2004 Summer Olympics
World Wrestling Championships medalists
Wrestlers at the 2002 Asian Games
Wrestlers at the 2006 Asian Games
Wrestlers at the 2010 Asian Games
Asian Games gold medalists for Uzbekistan
Asian Games medalists in wrestling
Ossetian people
Uzbekistani people of Ossetian descent
United Russia politicians
21st-century Russian politicians
Medalists at the 2002 Asian Games
Medalists at the 2006 Asian Games
Medalists at the 2010 Asian Games
Competitors stripped of Summer Olympics medals
Doping cases in wrestling
Uzbekistani sportspeople in doping cases
Sportspeople from North Ossetia–Alania
Seventh convocation members of the State Duma (Russian Federation)
Eighth convocation members of the State Duma (Russian Federation)